Art of the State is the first studio album by the Christian rock band AD, and the third solo album for its leader Kerry Livgren. The album was re-issued in the late 1990s under Livgren's new record label, Numavox Records.

Background 

In the previous year, Kerry Livgren and his newly formed group, AD, released their first album, Time Line. In the year following its release, Livgren was caught in a legal problem with his contract connection with Kansas, causing the band to make a decision. Unable to sell or perform their material in the Non-Christian Marketplace, AD had to release their newest records in the Christian Marketplace; a move that Livgren and the others never had expected would happen at first when the band was originally formed.

Realizing the limited options, the group accepted the offer and began work on their next record, which contained songs relating in strictly Christian themes. Livgren also decided with the others that AD should receive full credit for the production of the album, rather than the album being split half and half for its creation. The tour for the band, unfortunately, was not as successful as intended, resulting in Warren Ham's departure from the band after the tour for Art of the State had ended.

Reception 

Compared to  review that Time Line received, AllMusic gave Art of the State a much more favorable review of four stars out of five; a drastic improvement from the 1984 release that both Livgren and AD took ownership of. Marked as a religious album, it was said to be unique in its own way and has created an enjoyable experience for the listener. It has been said to be strongly focused on songs of worship and praise while providing other songs of controversial subjects at the same time.

Track listing
All songs written by Kerry Livgren, otherwise indicated

"All Creation Sings" - 4:22
"We Are the Men" - 4:41
"Lead Me to Reason" (Michael Gleason) - 3:56
"The Only Way to Have a Friend" - 4:16
"Games of Chance and Circumstance" (Gleason) - 4:18
"The Fury" - 5:34
"Progress" - 4:39
"Heartland" (Gleason) - 3:42
"Zion" (Warren Ham, Livgren) - 3:26
"Up from the Wasteland" (Gleason, Livgren) - 4:25

Personnel 

A.D.
 Michael Gleason – lead vocals (1, 5, 6, 10), backing vocals, keyboards, guitars
 Warren Ham – lead vocals (1-4, 7-9), backing vocals, keyboards, harmonica, woodwinds
 Kerry Livgren – keyboards, guitars
 Dave Hope – bass guitar
 Dennis Holt – drums, percussion, backing vocals

Additional vocals
 Debi Chapman (1, 10)
 Susan Shewbridge (1, 10)

Production
 Mark Ferjulian – executive producer
 Ken Marcellino – executive producer, art direction, front cover art concept
 Kerry Livgren – producer, engineer 
 Michael Gleason – assistant engineer, front cover art concept
 Gary Westman – additional engineer 
 Glenn Meadows – mastering at Georgetown Masters (Nashville, Tennessee)
 Bill Murphy – art direction
 Tim Wild – front cover illustrations
 FM Management – management

References

External links
Review

1985 albums
AD (band) albums
Sparrow Records albums